Clephane-Cameron is a surname. Notable people with the surname include:

 Neil Clephane-Cameron (born 1960), historian of the Battle of Hastings 
 James Clephane-Cameron (born 1985), English poet

See also
Clephane
Cameron (surname)

Compound surnames